Leptospermum argenteum, commonly known as the Mt Royal tea-tree, is a species of shrub that is endemic to the higher parts of Barrington Tops in New South Wales. It has smooth bark, stems with a flange along the sides, broad leaves, white flowers and unlike many others in the genus, it is never lemon-scented.

Description
It has smooth bark that is shed in strips or flakes. Young stems are densely hairy at first and have a conspicuous flange, especially near the base of the leaves. Flowering mainly occurs in January and the fruit is a woody capsule  in diameter.

Taxonomy and naming
Leptospermum argenteum was first formally described in 1989 by Joy Thompson in the journal Telopea. The specific epithet (argenteum) is from Latin argenteus, meaning "silvery in colour", referring to the colour of the new growth.

Distribution and habitat
Mt Royal tea-tree grows in forest and woodland, along streams and in swamps in the Barrington Tops area, including the Barrington Tops and Mount Royal National Parks and the Stewarts Brook State Forest.

References

argenteum
Myrtales of Australia
Flora of New South Wales
Plants described in 1989